Staryi Rynok Square is a square in Lviv, Ukraine. It is located north of the Market Square, along Bohdan Khmelnytsky street, in the vicinity of St. Nicholas Church. The area in which the square is situated constituted the town center during the earliest period of Lviv's history, when it was part of the Galician-Volhynian state.

Notable buildings
Tempel Synagogue, destroyed in 1941 
Former St. John the Baptist Roman Catholic Church, now the Museum of Historic Artifacts of Lviv

References

Buildings and structures in Lviv
Squares in Lviv
Tourist attractions in Lviv